Flint Southwestern Academy (FSA, Southwestern Academy, or Flint Southwestern) is located in Flint, Michigan, United States. This school is a part of the Flint Community Schools.

In 1989 Flint Academy closed and the school merged with Southwestern to become Flint Southwestern Academy. During the first year of the merger, the graduating class could choose what school was listed on their diploma: "Flint Academy", "Southwestern", or "Flint Southwestern Academy". The 2009 closing of Flint Central High School sent many former Flint Central High School students to Southwestern and led to the reopening of McKinley Middle School, which relieved potential overcrowding at Southwestern. Flint Southwestern Academy now serves grades 9–12.

Academics

Flint Southwestern Academy is a state and nationally accredited school through the AdvancED/North Central Accreditation of Colleges and Schools.

Demographic

Flint Southwestern Academy School Profile 2012/2013

Athletics

Boys

Boys Baseball

1978 Class A State Champion

Boys Track and Field

1961 Class A State Runner-up
1966 Class A State Champion
1975 Class A State Champion
1976 Class A State Runner-up
1977 Class A State Champion
1978 Class A State Runner-up

Boys Golf

1962 Class A State Champion
1963 Class A State Champion
1967 Class A State Champion

Boys Cross Country
1960 Class A State Runner-up
1962 Class A State Runner-up

Girls

None

Notable alumni
Charlie Bell, NBA player, member of Michigan State University 2000 National Championship team
Miles Bridges, NBA player for Charlotte Hornets
Brian Carpenter, former NFL player
Terry Crews, actor and former NFL player
Mark Ingram II, 2009 Heisman Trophy winner, NFL player
Rick Leach, former MLB player and University of Michigan quarterback
Booker Moore, football standout at Penn State University, former NFL player
Ricky Patton, former NFL player
Merv Rettenmund(baseball), former MLB player
Daryl Turner, former NFL player
Reggie Williams, football standout at Dartmouth College, former NFL player for Cincinnati Bengals

See also
 Flint Community Schools
Flint Central Closed 2009
 Flint Northern Closed 2013
 Flint Northwestern Closed in 2018, Re-opened as Flint Junior High in 2019

References

External links
Flint Southwestern Academy
 Flint Community Schools

Public middle schools in Michigan
High schools in Flint, Michigan
Educational institutions established in 1989
Public high schools in Michigan
1989 establishments in Michigan